Abu Ghoveyr (also Romanized as Abū Ghoveyr and Abūghovīr; also known as Abū Ghūyer, Abu Qoveyr, and Abū Qūyer) is a village in Abu Ghoveyr Rural District, Musian District, Dehloran County, Ilam Province, Iran. At the 2006 census, its population was 340, in 56 families. The village is populated by Arabs.

References 

Populated places in Dehloran County
Arab settlements in llam Province